Frank N. "Mickey" Schubert (born June 3, 1943) is an American author and military historian. He was the chief of joint operational history in the Joint History Office, Office of the Chairman, Joint Chiefs of Staff until his retirement in 2003. He is a graduate of Howard University (BA, 1965), the University of Wyoming (MA, 1970), and the University of Toledo (PhD, 1977). He is a veteran of the Vietnam War and worked as a historian in the Department of Defense for the US Army Corps of Engineers (1977–1989), the US Army Center of Military History (1989–1993), and the Joint History Office of the Office of the Chairman of the Joint Chiefs of Staff (1993–2003). He was a Fulbright scholar at Babes Bolyai University in Cluj, Romania, during the academic year 2003–2004 and has lectured at universities and research centers in seven European countries. His published work has focused on North American frontier exploration, black soldiers in the US Army, and military construction. He was born in Washington, DC.

Bibliography

References

1943 births
Living people
American military writers
20th-century American historians
21st-century American historians
Howard University alumni
University of Wyoming alumni
University of Toledo alumni
20th-century American male writers
21st-century American male writers
American male non-fiction writers